Newton Cardoso (born 22 May 1938) is a Brazilian politician who served as a Member of the Chamber of Deputies and as Governor of Minas Gerais from 1987 to 1991.

His son Newton Cardoso Jr is a Member of the Chamber of Deputies.

References

1938 births
Living people
Governors of Minas Gerais
Members of the Chamber of Deputies (Brazil) from Minas Gerais
Brazilian Democratic Movement politicians